The Japan women's national softball team is the national team of Japan in international softball competitions. It is governed by the Japan Softball Association. They are currently ranked #2 in the world by the International Softball Federation. In four Olympic Games, since 1996 until 2008, Japan has won one gold medal, a silver medal and a bronze medal. In the top four nations at the Olympics, Japan is the second most successful national team (winning three medals), following the United States (four medals, three gold and a silver), and beating out Australia (also four medals out of which three were bronze and one silver) and China with one silver medal. After winning the gold medal at the 2008 Summer Olympics, the Japanese national team was defeated by the United States team at the XII Women's Softball World Championship in Caracas, Venezuela.

Team

Roster

Schedule and results
On July 20, 2021, Japan won the initial game, which was against Australia; the result was 8:0. The game took place in Sabara, Fukushima.

The future of the Japanese national softball team

The International Olympic Committee decided that softball and baseball should not be included in the 2016 Summer Olympics. Still, fast pitch softball tournaments are organized all over the World, and they provide the opportunity for the National teams to compete at the highest level players can attain. The Japan Softball Association holds the Japan Softball Cup, and other competitions include the World Cup of Softball and the International Softball Federation Women's World Championship.

Additional information
At the 2008 Summer Olympics, the Japanese prized pitcher, Yukiko Ueno, shut down the seemingly unstoppable American batters. Spectators labeled her the star of the series. With her challenging fast ball, the 26-year-old right hander threw 413 pitches in three full games over two days. In the game against the United States she threw strike after strike with speed and movement even though she had a huge blister on her pitching hand. 
At the 2008 Summer Olympics, the Japanese National Women's Softball Team had to pull out a 4–3 extra-inning win against Australia with Rei Nishiyama belting a home run in the 12th inning to reach the final. In the game prior to that, Japan lost 4–1 to the United States with the Americans scoring four runs in the ninth which allowed the Americans to reach the final. 
At the 2000 Summer Olympics in Sydney, the Japanese National Women's Softball Team won all their games until the gold medal match in which they lost to the United States 1–0 in extra inning and had to settle for the silver. The Japanese had beaten the United States in an earlier game, ending the American's 112-game winning streak.
In the Athens Olympics in 2004, Yukiko Ueno entered the history books by pitching the first perfect game in Olympic history, leading Japan to a 2–0 win over China.
Many softball players from abroad come to Japan to play for Japanese Corporate teams. Each team is allowed two foreigners, some even coming from the United States National Softball team.

Honours
Olympics: Gold Medal – 2008, 2020; Silver Medal – 2000; Bronze Medal – 2004
ISF Women's World Championship: Gold Medal – 1970; Silver Medal – 2002, 2006; Bronze Medal – 1965, 1998
Softball at the World Games: Gold Medal – 2009; Silver Medal – 2022
2006 Japan Softball Cup: 2nd
World Cup of Softball: 1st – 2005; 2nd – 2007, 2006

References
Hays, Jeff. (2010) "America football, Basketball, and Team Sports in Japan". Facts and Details. March 2010. Retrieved 4 August 2010 from FactsandDetails.com:https://web.archive.org/web/20120227041840/http://factsanddetails.com/japan.php?itemid=765&catid=21&subcatid=140

External links
Japan Softball Association (JSA) official website 
International Softball Federation

 
Women's national softball teams
Softball in Japan
Softball